

Joachim von Tresckow (20 June 1894 – 3 November 1958) was a German general during World War II. He was a recipient of the Knight's Cross of the Iron Cross of Nazi Germany.

Awards and decorations

 Knight's Cross of the Iron Cross on 19 September 1944 as Generalleutnant and commander of the 18. Luftwaffen-Feld-Division

References

Citations

Bibliography

 

1894 births
1958 deaths
Military personnel from Gdańsk
People from West Prussia
Lieutenant generals of the German Army (Wehrmacht)
German Army personnel of World War I
Prussian Army personnel
Recipients of the clasp to the Iron Cross, 1st class
Recipients of the Gold German Cross
Recipients of the Knight's Cross of the Iron Cross
German Army generals of World War II